Ahmed Khalil Sebait Mubarak Al-Junaibi (born 8 June 1991) is an Emirati footballer who plays as a forward for Al Bataeh and United Arab Emirates national team.

In 2006, Ahmed won the 2006 GCC U-17 Championship with UAE U17, in which he was top scorer with five goals. Later in the same years, he joined the first team. The following season with Al-Ahli, Ahmed won his first club honour, the President Cup, and was the top scorer with four goals. In 2008, Ahmed won Super Cup and his first Pro-League 2008–09, and with UAE U20 won the AFC U-19 Championship 2008, and was named player of the tournament and the top scorer with four goals. He was named the most promising Arab Player of the Year by Al-Ahram and Al Hadath magazines and also Asian Young Footballer of the Year. In 2009, Ahmed led UAE U20 to the Quarter-finals in the 2009 FIFA U-20 World Cup, and scored two goals in the tournament, and was named for the second consecutive time Al-Ahram Most promising Arab player of the Year and nominee of the Asian Young Footballer of the Year for two times. In 2010, Ahmed continued his outstanding performance, by leading UAE Olympic football team. to win the 2010 GCC U-23 Championship by scoring five goals in the tournament and win the top scorer, and for the first ever football silver medal in UAE history at the Asian Games and scored three goals in the tournament. He was named the Best Young Athlete Player of the Year by Mohammed Bin Rashid Al Maktoum Creative Sports Award.

Ahmed won the Asian Footballer of the Year in 2015 after leading his club to the final of the AFC Champions League and UAE to the third-place in the 2015 AFC Asian Cup.

Early life
Ahmed was born on 8 June 1991 in Sharjah, descended from a family of footballers. His father, Khalil Sebait, is a former player for an old football club during his time in Kuwait and his brothers Fahd, Fouad (Retired), Faisal, Fathi, Mohamed, and finally Ahmed, all of whom played for Al Ahli.

Club career

Al Ahli 
Ahmed started his career in the Red Fort at the age of eight, and included in the youth teams until he reached the first team, in the middle of the 2006–07 season under French coach Alan Michel On 13 May 2007, (at 16 years) in 89 min and 3 sec, Ahmed scored his first goal for the club and in the league, in a 4–1 victory over Al Wahda.

2009–10 season
On 18 March 2010, Ahmad scored his first hat-trick of the season against Al-Nasr SC. The match ended a 4–2 win for Al Ahli. On 30 March 2010, against Al-Hilal in the AFC Champions League, Khalil scored a goal in the 42nd minute, before the end of the first half. The game ended 3–2 to Al-Hilal.

Negotiations with Portsmouth
On 24 June 2009 news spread that Khalil will move to the Premier League after what Sulaiman Al-Fahim said that Portsmouth is in need the services of Khalil.

2010–11 season

On 26 August 2010, Ahmed start the season with a 2–0 defeat against Al Dhafra in his first match. On 2 September 2010, Ahmed scored his first goal in this season in a 4–1 victory over arch rivals Al Wasl. His goalscoring run ended after this match. On 24 September 2010, Ahmed assisted teammate Ahmad Khamis against Al Jazira which ended in a 2–2 draw, He once again assisted teammate Ahmad Khamis to score a goal in a 3–1 win against Dubai on 15 October 2010. After his absence from the scoring for a five games he back to score against Al Sharjah with a free kick on a 2–1 win. In the last match in 2010 he assisted teammate Pinga in a 1–0 win against Baniyas. His first goal in 2011 came against Al Jazira with a penalty kick on a 5–1 away loss. He continued his goalscoring in the next fixture against Dubai on a 2–1 away loss. After two games without goalscoring, he scored the tie goal 1–1 against Al Sharjah in a 2–3 away victory.

2011–12 season
Ahmed started the season with Al Ahli by beating Kazma 1–0 in the first leg of the GCC Champions League Semi-final.

Al Jazira 
Starting from summer 2017, Ahmed joined Al Jazira Club on a free transfer deal.

International career
Ahmed is one of the few who have played for 3 national team at the same time, (U-20, U-23 and UAE). He has been playing for the U-20 since he was just 15 in 2006, and has made over 70 appearances for UAE at junior levels (U-17, U-19, U-20 and U-23), as well as 13 appearances for the senior team.

The beginning of Ahmed with national teams was with under-17 by winning the 2006 GCC U-17 Championship in the Saudi Arabia. And he won the Golden Boot after scoring 5 goals in 5 matches of 5 Uae's matches in the tournament. In 2008, in Dammam, Saudi Arabia, with under-20, he was part of a team that won the 2008 AFC U-19 Championship and was a factor by scoring two winning goals in the final against Uzbekistan. He was named Player of the tournament and awarded the Golden Boot with four goals. A year later, he led the under-20 to the quarter-final in 2009 FIFA U-20 World Cup and he scored two goal, one against Honduras with a free kick in the 41st minute, and one against Venezuela in the 83rd minute a pass from teammate Ahmed Ali. Perhaps his most successful year was the 2010, in which he led the Olympic team to win the 2010 GCC U-23 Championship and was the top scorer with five goals of 4 matches. After only two months, he came back to lead the Olympic team for the first ever football silver medal in UAE history at Asian Games, and scored three goals, one against Bangladesh in the 3–0 victory and two in a 0–3 victory over Uzbekistan.

2010 AFC U-19 Championship
On 4 October 2010, Ahmed played against Japan and scored a last-minute draw goal but the match ended in 2–1 loss, In second match was against Jordan ended 0–0, In his third and final Group match, Ahmed scored a hat-trick in a 4–0 win against Vietnam. In the quarter-finals, against Australia with the score at 1–0 for Australia, he won a penalty and turned the match to draw 1–1, again he turn the match to a 2–2 draw in the last minutes, the match went to extra times but ended with a 4–2 win. Ahmed scored six of his side's seven tournament goals, an amazing feat that cemented him as the runner-up for the tournament Golden Boot.

2011 AFC Asian Cup
On 11 January 2011, Ahmed played his first official match in international competition in UAE 0–0 draw with North Korea, he tried to help the attack to score but couldn't, and Al Kathiri came on as a substitute for Ahmed in the 77th minute. In his second game against Iraq, his form was too bad and the match ended in a 1–0 loss. On the third and last group stage match UAE were eliminated from the Asian Cup with a 3–0 loss against Iran. Ahmed failed to make an impact in the Asian Cup; his performance was so disappointing and did not score any goal.

2012 Summer Olympics
He was included in Mahdi Ali's squad to participate in 2012 Summer Olympics in the country's first appearance. He played his first match against Uruguay; however, the match ended 1–2 in favor of Uruguay. He also played UAE's next matches against Great Britain and Senegal which ended 1–3 and 1–1. UAE finished at the bottom of the group and Khalil failed to score in the tournament.

2015 AFC Asian Cup
Khalil was named in United Arab Emirates' final squad for 2015 AFC Asian Cup, held in Australia. He started in UAE's opener match against Qatar and scored two goals at their 4–1 win. He scored the first goal when Qatar was led the game 1–0 and scored the second 20 minutes later. At the end, he was named as man of the match and is the second top scorer of the tournament behind his teammate Ali Mabkhout.

2018 FIFA World Cup qualification
On 3 September 2015, Khalil scored four goals, in a 10–0 defeat of Malaysia in a 2018 FIFA World Cup qualifier.

Career statistics

Club

1Other tournaments include the President Cup and Etisalat Cup, Etisalat Super Cup

International

International goals

Scores and results list the United Arab Emirates' goal tally first.

Honours

Club
Al Ahli

UAE Pro League: 3
 2008–09, 2013–14, 2015–16
UAE Super Cup: 4
 2008, 2012, 2014, 2016
UAE President's Cup: 2
 2007–08, 2012–13
UAE League Cup: 3
 2012, 2014, 2017

Shabab Al Ahli

UAE President Cup: 1
 2018–19
UAE League Cup: 1
 2019

Al Ain

UAE Pro League: 1
 2017–18

UAE President's Cup: 1
 2017–18

International
GCC U-17 Championship: 1
 2006
AFC U-19 Championship: 1
 2008
GCC U-23 Championship: 1
 2010
Asian Games Silver Medal: 1
 2010
Arabian Gulf Cup: 1
 2013
AFC Asian Cup third place: 1
 2015

Individual
GCC U-17 Championship top goalscorer: 1
 2006
UAE President Cup top goalscorer: 1
 2007–08
AFC U-19 Championship top goalscorer: 1
 2008
AFC U-19 Championship Player of the Tournament: 1
 2008
Asian Young Footballer of the Year: 1
 2008
GCC U-23 Championship top goalscorer: 1
 2010
Best Young Athlete Player of the Year: 1
 2010
Al-Ahram Most promising Arab player of the Year: 2
 2008, 2009
Al Hadath Most promising Arab player of the Year: 1
 2008
Asian Footballer of the Year: 1
 2015

See also
 List of men's footballers with 100 or more international caps

References

External links

 
 
 
 
 

1991 births
Living people
Emirati footballers
Association football forwards
United Arab Emirates international footballers
Al Ahli Club (Dubai) players
Al Jazira Club players
Al Ain FC players
Shabab Al-Ahli Club players
Al Bataeh Club players
People from the Emirate of Sharjah
2011 AFC Asian Cup players
Footballers at the 2012 Summer Olympics
2015 AFC Asian Cup players
2019 AFC Asian Cup players
Olympic footballers of the United Arab Emirates
Asian Young Footballer of the Year winners
UAE Pro League players
Asian Games medalists in football
Footballers at the 2010 Asian Games
Asian Games silver medalists for the United Arab Emirates
Medalists at the 2010 Asian Games
FIFA Century Club
United Arab Emirates youth international footballers